Christopher David Steele (born 24 June 1964) is a British former intelligence officer with the Secret Intelligence Service (MI6) from 1987 until his retirement in 2009. He ran the Russia desk at MI6 headquarters in London between 2006 and 2009. In 2009, he co-founded Orbis Business Intelligence, a London-based private intelligence firm.

Steele became the centre of controversy after he authored a 35-page series of memos for a controversial political opposition research report later known as the Steele dossier. It was prepared for Fusion GPS, a firm hired by an attorney associated with the Hillary Clinton 2016 presidential campaign. The dossier claims, based on anonymous sources, that Russia collected a file of compromising information on Donald Trump and that his presidential campaign conspired to cooperate with the Russians in their interference in the 2016 presidential elections.

Trump and his allies have falsely claimed the U.S. intelligence community probe into that Russian interference was launched due to Steele's dossier. Contrary to these false claims, the Republican-controlled House Intelligence Committee, among many other sources, concluded in an April 2018 report that the probe had been triggered by previous information from Trump adviser George Papadopoulos, and the February 2018 Nunes memo, written by staff members for that GOP committee, reached the same conclusion.

Early life 

Christopher David Steele was born in the Yemeni city of Aden (then part of the British-controlled Federation of South Arabia), on 24 June 1964. His parents, Perris and Janet, met while working at the Met Office, the United Kingdom's national weather service. His paternal grandfather was a coal miner from Pontypridd in Wales. Steele spent time growing up in Aden, the Shetland Islands, and Cyprus, as well as at Wellington College, Berkshire.

Steele matriculated at Girton College, Cambridge in 1982. While at the University of Cambridge, he wrote for the student newspaper, Varsity. In the Easter term of 1986, Steele was President of the Cambridge Union debating society. He graduated with a degree in Social and Political Sciences in 1986.

Career 

Steele was recruited by MI6 directly following his graduation from Cambridge and worked for MI6 for 22 years. He worked in London at the Foreign and Commonwealth Office (FCO) from 1987 to 1989. From 1990 to 1993, Steele worked under diplomatic cover as an MI6 officer in Moscow, serving at the Embassy of the United Kingdom in Moscow. Steele was an "internal traveller", surviving over thirty Aeroflot flights and visiting newly-accessible cities such as Samara and Kazan. 

He returned to London in 1993, working again at the FCO until his posting with the British Embassy in Paris in 1998, where he served under diplomatic cover until 2002. The identity of Steele as an MI6 officer and those of a hundred and sixteen other British spies were revealed in an anonymously published list.

In 2003, Steele was sent to Bagram Airfield in Afghanistan as part of an MI6 team, briefing Special Forces on "kill or capture" missions for Taliban targets, and also spent time teaching new MI6 recruits. Steele returned to London and between 2006 and 2009 he headed the Russia Desk at MI6.

He served as a senior officer under John Scarlett, Chief of the Secret Intelligence Service (MI6), from 2004 to 2009. Steele was a counterintelligence specialist and was selected as case officer for Alexander Litvinenko and participated in the investigation of the Litvinenko poisoning in 2006. It was Steele who quickly realised that Litvinenko's death "was a Russian state 'hit. Twelve years later, Russian double agent Boris Karpichkov alleged that Steele himself was included in a hit list of the Russian Federal Security Service, along with Sergei Skripal who was poisoned in 2018 by a binary chemical weapon Novichok in Britain.

Since 2009, Steele has not been to Russia or any other former Soviet states. In 2012, an Orbis informant quoted an FSB-agent describing him as an "enemy of Mother Russia". Steele has refrained from travelling to the United States since his authorship of the Steele dossier became public, citing the political and legal situation.

In 2012, Orbis was sub-contracted by a law firm representing Oleg Deripaska, who was also a "person of interest" to the Senate Intelligence Committee's investigation into Russia's election interference. Between 2014 and 2016, together with Bruce Ohr, Steele cooperated with the FBI's and Justice Department's unsuccessful efforts to flip Deripaska into an informant.

Private sector 

In March 2009, Steele and fellow MI6-retiree Chris Burrows co-founded the private intelligence agency Orbis Business Intelligence, Ltd., based in Grosvenor Square Gardens. Between 2014 and 2016, Steele created over 100 reports on Russian and Ukrainian issues, which were read within the United States Department of State, and he was viewed as credible by the United States intelligence community. The business was commercially successful, grossing approximately $20,000,000 in the first nine years of operation.

Steele ran an investigation dubbed "Project Charlemagne", which noted Russian interference in the domestic politics of France, Italy, Germany, Turkey, and the United Kingdom. In April 2016, Steele concluded that Russia was engaged in an information warfare campaign with the goal of destroying the European Union.

In November 2018, Steele sued the German industrial group Bilfinger, alleging that the company owed €150,000 for an investigation into Bilfinger's activities in Nigeria and Sakhalin.

FIFA research 

In 2010, The Football Association (FA), England's domestic football governing body, organised a committee in the hope of hosting the 2018 or 2022 World Cups. The FA hired Orbis Business Intelligence to investigate FIFA (International Federation of Association Football). In advance of the FBI launching its 2015 FIFA corruption case, members of the FBI's Eurasian Organized Crime Task Force met with Steele in London to discuss allegations of possible corruption in FIFA. Steele's research indicated that Russian Deputy Prime Minister Igor Sechin had rigged the bidding of the 2018 World Cups by employing bribery.

Attempts by China to influence UK elite 

Steele also contributed to a privately commissioned report that alleged China attempted to influence key figures in British politics and business. The report was submitted to selected British MPs and some media.

Steele dossier

Background and information gathering 

In September 2015, The Washington Free Beacon, a conservative publication, retained the services of Fusion GPS, a private Washington D.C. political research firm, to conduct research on several primary Republican Party candidates, including Trump. The research was not primarily related to Russia and was ended once Trump was determined to be the presidential nominee.

The firm was subsequently hired by the Hillary Clinton campaign and the Democratic National Committee through their shared attorney at Perkins Coie, Marc Elias. Fusion GPS then hired Steele, to investigate Trump's Russia-related activities, and this investigation produced what became known as the Steele dossier.  Steele's dossier relied, among others, on long-term Clinton-associated sources.

In July 2016, Steele supplied a report he had written to an FBI agent in Rome. His contact at the FBI was the same senior agent with whom he had worked when investigating the FIFA scandal. Two individuals "affiliated" with Russian Intelligence were also aware of Steele's election investigation at this time.

In September 2016, Steele held a series of off the record meetings with journalists from The New York Times, The Washington Post, Yahoo! News, The New Yorker and CNN. In October 2016, Steele spoke about his discoveries to David Corn of the progressive American political magazine Mother Jones. Steele said he decided to pass his dossier to both British and American intelligence officials after concluding that the material should not just be in the hands of political opponents of Trump, but was a matter of national security for both countries. Corn's resulting 31 October article in Mother Jones was the first to publicly mention information which became part of the dossier, although the article did not disclose Steele's identity. The magazine did not publish the dossier itself, however, or detail its allegations, since they could not be verified.

Whistleblower 

Steele's reaction to the revelations from his sources has been described as that of a whistleblower. Steele has said that he soon found "troubling information indicating connections between Trump and the Russian government". According to his sources, "there was an established exchange of information between the Trump campaign and the Kremlin of mutual benefit". According to Harding, "Steele was shocked by the extent of collusion his sources were reporting", and told his friends: "For anyone who reads it, this is a life-changing experience." Steele felt what he had unearthed "was something of huge significance, way above party politics". American reporter Howard Blum described Steele's rationale for becoming a whistleblower: "The greater good trumps all other concerns."

On his own initiative, Steele decided to also pass the information to British and American intelligence services because he believed the findings were a matter of national security for both countries. According to Simpson's testimony, Steele, who enjoyed a good working reputation "for the knowledge he had developed over nearly 20 years working on Russia-related issues for British intelligence, approached the FBI because he was concerned that Trump, then a candidate, was being blackmailed by Russia, and he became "very concerned about whether this represented a national security threat".

In relation to a defamation lawsuit filed by Aleksej Gubarev against BuzzFeed, regarding their publication of the dossier, Senior Master Barbara Fontaine said Steele was "in many respects in the same position as a whistle-blower" because of his actions "in sending part of the dossier to Senator John McCain and a senior government national security official, and in briefing sections of the US media".

Ending of cooperation with FBI 

Steele first became a confidential human source (CHS) for the FBI in 2013 in connection with the investigation in the FIFA corruption case, but he considered the relationship as contractual. He said the relationship "was never really resolved and both sides turned a blind eye to it. It was not really ideal." Later, the Inspector General report on the Crossfire Hurricane investigation discusses "divergent expectations about Steele's conduct in connection with his election reporting", as Steele considered his first duty to his paying clients, and not to the FBI. The Inspector General's report states that "Steele contends that he was never a CHS for the FBI but rather that his consulting firm had a contractual relationship with the FBI." (Footnote 200) Steele said "he never recalled being told that he was a CHS and that he never would have accepted such an arrangement, ..." This divergence in expectations was a factor that "ultimately resulted in the FBI formally closing Steele as a CHS in November 2016 (although ... the FBI continued its relationship with Steele through Ohr)".

On 28 October 2016, days before the election, Comey notified Congress that the FBI had started looking into newly discovered Hillary Clinton emails. Simpson and Fritsch described their reaction: "Comey's bombshell prompted the Fusion partners to decide they needed to do what they could to expose the FBI's probe of Trump and Russia. It was Hail Mary time." The founders of Fusion GPS were very upset by a misleading 1 November 2016, New York Times article "published a week before the election with the headline: 'Investigating Donald Trump, FBI Sees No Clear Link to Russia'. In fact, Russia was meddling in the election to help Trump win, the U.S. intelligence community would later conclude, though Special Counsel Robert Mueller did not find evidence that Trump’s campaign team conspired with the country."

During questioning from Special Counsel John Durham, Brian Auten, a supervisory counterintelligence analyst with the FBI, testified that, shortly before the 2016 election, the FBI offered Steele "up to $1 million" if he could corroborate allegations in the dossier, but that Steele could not do so. Steele has disputed this description: "And to correct the Danchenko trial record, we were not offered $1 million by the FBI to ‘prove up’ our Trump-Russia reporting. Rather, we were told there were substantial funds to resettle sources in the US if they were prepared to testify in public. Understandably they were not."

In November 2016, after Steele discussed his findings with the press, the FBI formally closed Steele as a confidential human source. Simpson later said that "Steele severed his contacts with [the] FBI before the election following public statements by the FBI that it had found no connection between the Trump campaign and Russia and concerns that [the FBI] was being 'manipulated for political ends by the Trump people'." Steele had become frustrated with the FBI, whom he believed failed to investigate his reports, choosing instead to focus on the investigation into Clinton's emails. According to The Independent, Steele came to believe there was a "cabal" inside the FBI, particularly its New York field office linked to Trump advisor Rudy Giuliani, because it blocked any attempts to investigate the links between Trump and Russia.

Post-election work on the dossier 

Steele continued to work for Fusion GPS on the dossier without a client to pay him. After the election, Steele's dossier "became one of Washington's worst-kept secrets, and journalists worked to verify the allegations". On 18 November 2016, Sir Andrew Wood, British ambassador to Moscow from 1995 to 2000, met with U.S. Senator John McCain at the Halifax International Security Forum in Canada, and told McCain about the existence of the dossier about Trump. Wood vouched for Steele's professionalism and integrity. In early December, McCain obtained a copy of the dossier from David J. Kramer, a former U.S. State Department official working at Arizona State University. On 9 December 2016, McCain met with FBI Director James Comey to pass on the information.

In a second memo Steele wrote in November 2016, after the termination of his contract with Fusion GPS, he reported that Russian officials had claimed that Russia had blocked Donald Trump from nominating Mitt Romney to be his Secretary of State, due to Romney's hawkishness on Russia.

Revealed identity 

On 11 January 2017, The Wall Street Journal revealed that Steele was the author of the dossier about Trump, citing "people familiar with the matter". Although the dossier's existence had been "common knowledge" among journalists for months at that point and had become public knowledge during the previous week, Steele's name had not been revealed. The Telegraph asserted that Steele's anonymity had been "fatally compromised" after CNN published his nationality.

The Independent reported that Steele left his home in England several hours before his name was published as the author of the dossier, as he was fearful of retaliation by Russian authorities. In contrast, The Washington Post reported that he left after he had been identified earlier in the day by the initial The Wall Street Journal report.

Christopher Burrows, director of Orbis Business Intelligence, Ltd., said he would not "confirm or deny" that Orbis had produced the dossier.

On 7 March 2017, as some members of the United States Congress were expressing interest in meeting with or hearing testimony from Steele, he reemerged after weeks in hiding, appearing publicly on camera and stating, "I'm really pleased to be back here working again at the Orbis's offices in London today".

Disclosure and reactions 

In early January 2017, a two-page summary of the dossier was presented to President Barack Obama and incoming President Donald Trump in meetings with Director of National Intelligence James Clapper, FBI Director James Comey, CIA Director John Brennan, and NSA Director Admiral Mike Rogers.

On 10 January 2017, BuzzFeed News was the first media outlet to publish the full 35-page dossier. In publishing the Trump dossier, BuzzFeed said it had been unable to verify or corroborate the allegations. The UK issued a DSMA notice on 10 January 2017, requesting that the media not reveal Steele's identity, although the BBC and other UK news media released the information in news stories the same day. Trump said the dossier's allegations were "fake news" during a press conference. Vladimir Putin also dismissed the claims.

Ynet, an Israeli online news site, reported that US intelligence advised Israeli intelligence officers to be cautious about sharing information with the incoming Trump administration, until the possibility of Russian influence over Trump, suggested by Steele's report, has been fully investigated.

Former British ambassador to Russia, Sir Tony Brenton, read Steele's report. Speaking on Sky News he said, "I've seen quite a lot of intelligence on Russia, and there are some things in it which look pretty shaky". Brenton expressed some doubts due to discrepancies in how the dossier described aspects of the hacking activities, as well as Steele's ability to penetrate the Kremlin and Russian security agencies, given that he is an outsider.

On 15 March 2017, former Acting CIA Director Michael Morell raised questions about the dossier. He was concerned about the accuracy of the information, due to the approach taken by Steele to gather it. Steele gave money to intermediaries and the intermediaries paid the sources. Morell said, "Unless you know the sources, and unless you know how a particular source acquired a particular piece of information, you can't judge the information—you just can't." Morell, described as a "Clinton ally" by NBC News, strongly believes that Russia attempted to influence the election via social media, but that there is "smoke but no fire" on Trump's collusion with Russia. In a 2020 Washington Post editorial, Morell summarized his view that Russia launched a "human intelligence operation" against the Trump campaign, and that several officials in the Trump campaign may have passed on information due to "naivete".

No role in the origins of the FBI's Russia investigation 

Although the dossier later became one factor among many in the Russia investigation, it had no role in the start of the investigation. This fact has been the subject of intense discussion and controversy, largely fuelled by false claims made by Trump and his supporters.

In early February 2018, the Nunes memo, written by aides of Republican U.S. Representative Devin Nunes (who was at the time the Chair of the House Intelligence Committee), said the information on George Papadopoulos "triggered the opening of" the original FBI investigation in late July 2016 into links between the Trump campaign and Russia. In late February 2018, a rebuttal memo by Democrats in the House Intelligence Committee stated that "Christopher Steele's reporting... played no role in launching the counterintelligence investigation... In fact, Steele's reporting did not reach the counterintelligence team investigating Russia at FBI headquarters until mid-September 2016, more than seven weeks after the FBI opened its investigation, because the probe's existence was so closely held within the FBI."

In April 2018, the House Intelligence Committee, then under Republican control, released a final report on Russian interference in the 2016 election; the report said the House Intelligence Committee had found that "in late July 2016, the FBI opened an enterprise CI [counterintelligence] investigation into the Trump campaign following the receipt of derogatory information about foreign policy advisor George Papadopoulos".

Role in subsequent investigations 

In the summer of 2017, two Republican staffers for the United States House Permanent Select Committee on Intelligence travelled to London to investigate the dossier, visiting the office of Steele's lawyer but not meeting with Steele. In August 2018, Representative Devin Nunes, Chair of the House Intelligence Committee, travelled to London in an attempt to meet with the heads of MI5, MI6, and GCHQ for information about Steele, but was rebuffed by the three agencies.

Steele reportedly revealed the identities of the sources used in the dossier to the FBI. Investigators from Robert Mueller's Special Counsel investigation team met with Steele in September 2017 to interview him about the dossier's claims. The United States Senate Select Committee on Intelligence was in contact with lawyers representing Steele.

Over the course of two days in June 2019, Steele was interviewed in London by investigators from the United States Department of Justice Office of the Inspector General regarding the Steele dossier. They found his testimony surprising and his "information sufficiently credible to have to extend the investigation".

Legal action 

In February 2017, lawyers for Russian internet entrepreneur Aleksej Gubarev filed a libel suit against Steele in London. Gubarev claimed he was defamed by allegations in the dossier.

In August 2017, lawyers for Gubarev demanded Steele give a deposition regarding the dossier, as part of a libel lawsuit against BuzzFeed News filed in February. Steele objected to testifying but his objections were rejected by U.S. District Court Judge Ursula Mancusi Ungaro, who allowed the deposition to proceed.

In April 2018, Mikhail Fridman, Petr Aven, and German Khan—the owners of Russian commercial bank Alfa Bank—filed a libel suit in Washington D.C. against Steele, who mentioned the bank in the Steele dossier. The lawsuit was dismissed by Judge Anthony C. Epstein on 20 August 2018.

Alfa Bank partners Petr Aven, Mikhail Fridman, and German Khan brought a lawsuit for defamation in Britain against Orbis Business Intelligence, Steele's private intelligence firm. In July 2020, Justice Warby from the Queen's Bench Division of the British High Court of Justice ordered Steele to pay damages to Aven and Fridman who Steele claimed had delivered "large amounts of illicit cash" to Vladimir Putin when Putin was deputy mayor of St. Petersburg. Judge Warby said the claim was "demonstrably false" and awarded the damages to compensate "for the loss of autonomy, distress and reputational damage caused by the breaches of duty". The judge stated that Steele's dossier also inaccurately claimed that Aven and Fridman provided foreign policy advice to Putin.

Senate Republicans' referral for a criminal investigation 

On 5 January 2018, Senate Judiciary Committee Chairman Chuck Grassley, joined by senior Republican member Lindsey Graham, issued a criminal referral regarding Steele to the Justice Department for it to investigate whether Steele had lied to the FBI about his interactions with the media. Because the referral is based on classified FBI documents, the context in which the Republican senators allege Steele to have lied is limited to references that he discussed the dossier with media outlets. Both Grassley and Graham declared that they were not alleging Steele "had committed any crime. Rather, they had passed on the information for 'further investigation only'".

The referral was met with scepticism from legal experts, as well as members of both parties on the Judiciary Committee. Fusion GPS lawyer Joshua A. Levy said the referral was just another effort to discredit the investigation into Russian interference in the election and that, "after a year of investigations into Donald Trump's ties to Russia, the only person Republicans seek to accuse of wrongdoing is one who reported on these matters to law enforcement in the first place." Veteran prosecutor Peter Zeidenberg called the referral "nonsense" because "the FBI doesn't need any prompting from politicians to prosecute people who have lied to them." Another former federal prosecutor, Justin Dillon, said it was "too early to assume the letter was simply a political attack". The senior Democrat on the Committee, Dianne Feinstein, said the referral was made without consultation of any Democrats on the committee and released a five-page rebuttal. A Republican aide said Grassley and Graham were "carrying water for the White House"; that their actions did not reflect the views of the committee as a whole; and that other members were upset with Grassley over the matter.

In an opinion-editorial for Politico, former CIA official John Sipher said the attacks on Steele, a private citizen who provided information to the FBI that alarmed him, will make future tipsters less likely to approach American law enforcement with information bearing on national security.

U.S. Inspector General findings 

On 9 December 2019, U.S. Inspector General Michael Horowitz testified to the House Judiciary Committee that, despite having made 17 mistakes in their applications to the Foreign Intelligence Surveillance Court (FISA), the FBI showed no political bias during the investigation of Trump and the Russian government. A redacted version of his report was released the same day.

Steele was a paid confidential human source for the FBI before preparing the Steele dossier, and the FBI found "Steele's information to be valuable and that it warranted compensation", with Steele receiving $95,000 from the FBI between 2014 and 2016 for information on previous matters unrelated to Trump. From information in the report, ABC News determined that Steele and Ivanka Trump had had a business and personal relationship from 2007 for a number of years.

One of the report's findings related to conflicting accounts of sourced content in the dossier. When one of Steele's sources was later interviewed by the FBI about the allegations sourced to them, they gave accounts which conflicted with Steele's renderings in the dossier. They indicated that Steele "misstated or exaggerated" the source's statements.

The IG found it difficult to discern the causes for the discrepancies between some dossier allegations and explanations later provided to the FBI by the sources of those allegations. The IG attributed the discrepancies to three possible factors: miscommunication between Steele and the sources, "exaggerations or misrepresentations" by Steele, or misrepresentations by the sources when questioned by the FBI.

Another factor was described by the Supervisory Intel Analyst, who believed someone described as "one of the key sources" for the dossier "may have been attempting to minimise his/her role in the election reporting following its release to the public." That person had been the source for "the alleged meeting between Carter Page and Igor Divyekin" and the "allegations concerning Michael Cohen and events in Prague".

ABC News documentary 

Following the dossier's release, Steele completely avoided on-camera interviews until he participated in an ABC News documentary that was aired on Hulu on October 18, 2021. In that documentary, Steele maintained that his sources were credible and that it was typical in intelligence investigations to "never get to the point where you're 99% certain of the evidence to secure a conviction". Steele also acknowledged that one of his sources had faced repercussions; he confirmed that the source was still alive, but he would not provide further details.

=== Included in Vanity Fair'''s 2018 "New Establishment" list ===

In 2018, Steele was included as number 38 in Vanity Fair's 100-person "New Establishment" list. He had grown a beard and been in hiding, but sent a thank you note explaining why he could not attend given his "present legal and political situation". When he broke his silence, he used it to criticize Trump during these "strange and troubling times".

 Personal life 

Steele was first married to Laura Hunt in July 1990. They had three children; Hunt died in 2009 after a long illness. He remarried in 2012. He and his second wife Katherine had one child and are raising all four children together. He lives in Farnham, Surrey.

 References 

 Further reading 
 Bensinger, Ken (2018): Red Card: How the U.S. Blew the Whistle on the World's Biggest Sports Scandal, Simon and Schuster.
 Hamburger, Tom; Helderman, Rosalind S. (6 February 2018). "Hero or hired gun? How a British former spy became a flash point in the Russia investigation." The Washington Post.
 
 
 
 Sipher, John (5 February 2018). "The Smearing of Christopher Steele." Politico''.

External links 

 Home page for Orbis Business Intelligence

1964 births
Alumni of Girton College, Cambridge
English people of Welsh descent
Living people
People from Aden
Presidents of the Cambridge Union
Russia–United Kingdom relations
People associated with Russian interference in the 2016 United States elections
Secret Intelligence Service personnel
United Kingdom–United States relations
People from Farnham